Four Mile Run, also known as Ruska Dolina (Rusyn Valley), is a valley in the Greenfield section of Pittsburgh, Pennsylvania, United States. The small neighborhood formed around the growth of Pittsburgh's steel industry as Rusyn immigrants settled in the area for employment at the nearby steel mill in the Hazelwood neighborhood and formed St. John Chrysostom Byzantine Catholic Church.

For Pittsburghers, it is a place driven over and seldom seen, although St. John Chrysostom Byzantine Catholic Church's golden lit domes can be observed from the Parkway East (Interstate 376).

The Run
The neighborhood is distinctive because of its severe geographic isolation from the rest of the city. Today the stream Four Mile Run is piped underneath the neighborhood to the Monongahela River.

Ruska Dolina
In the early 20th century many Rusyn immigrants from the Carpathian Mountains settled in Four Mile Run. Most came to work in Pittsburgh's steel industry, and the neighborhood was adjacent to a large steel mill of the Jones and Laughlin Steel Company. Thus they called their community "Ruska Dolina", which translates as Rusyn Valley. In 1910 they established a church there, St. John Chrysostom Byzantine Catholic Church. The parish is famous today as the childhood place of worship for the Rusyn artist Andy Warhol and his family, who lived in nearby Oakland.

See also
 List of Pittsburgh neighborhoods

References

External links
Photo of Four Mile Run Bridge above the neighborhood

Greenfield (Pittsburgh)
Neighborhoods in Pittsburgh
Rusyn-American culture in Pennsylvania